Northlake is a city in Cook County, Illinois, United States. The population was 12,840 at the 2020 census. The city's moniker is "The City of Friendly People". The name "Northlake" comes from two streets, North Avenue (IL 64) and Lake Street (US 20), which intersect on the city's West border.

Geography

Demographics
As of the 2020 census there were 12,840 people, 4,188 households, and 2,979 families residing in the city. The racial makeup of the city was 39.08% White, 3.81% African American, 2.27% Native American, 2.93% Asian, 0.00% Pacific Islander, 33.98% from other races, and 17.93% from two or more races. Hispanic or Latino of any race were 61.70% of the population.

There were 4,188 households, out of which 58.98% had children under the age of 18 living with them, 43.29% were married couples living together, 19.10% had a female householder with no husband present, and 28.87% were non-families. 24.12% of all households were made up of individuals, and 10.91% had someone living alone who was 65 years of age or older. The average household size was 3.48 and the average family size was 2.87.

The city's age distribution consisted of 24.4% under the age of 18, 9.0% from 18 to 24, 26.6% from 25 to 44, 25.3% from 45 to 64, and 14.8% who were 65 years of age or older. The median age was 37.7 years. For every 100 females, there were 94.6 males. For every 100 females age 18 and over, there were 86.6 males.

The median income for a household in the city was $60,495, and the median income for a family was $69,475. Males had a median income of $43,580 versus $32,003 for females. The per capita income for the city was $23,813. About 15.3% of families and 15.4% of the population were below the poverty line, including 19.9% of those under age 18 and 8.6% of those age 65 or over.

Economy
A Dominick's distribution center was located in Northlake until the supermarket chain's closure in December 2013. Empire Today is headquartered in Northlake.

Education

Northlake is serviced by two elementary school districts: District 87 (Berkeley) and District 83 (Mannheim).
 District 83: Operates Roy Elementary School and Westdale Elementary School in Northlake and Mannheim Middle School in Melrose Park
 District 87: Riley Elementary School, Whittier Elementary School, and Northlake Middle School

Two high school districts serve sections of Northlake:
 West Leyden High School District 212
North of North Ave, west of Mannheim Rd, and south of Belmont Ave is served by West Leyden High School District 212 (with few exceptions).
 Proviso Township High Schools District 209; the section is served by Proviso West High School in Hillside.

Private schools:
 St. John Vianney

Triton College is the designated community college.

Centerpoint Preserve

The Centerpoint Preserve (Grant Park) is a  preserve that was donated to the City of Northlake by Centerpoint Properties. Located in the heart of Northlake, Centerpoint Preserve has become the center of activity for the city. The park has a walking/bicycle path and a dog park. Along the walking path there are many different workout stations for pull ups, wall hurdles, squat bars, sit-up benches and there is also beautiful metal art work along the path. The park is monitored by several cameras, and the Northlake police department surveys the area often, making it a safe place to work out at night. The city also has plans for a picnic area with running water.

Notable people
 Tom Dore, retired American basketball player and former play-by-play announcer for the Chicago Bulls. He is a native of Northlake.
 Eugene C. Doyle, member of the Illinois House of Representatives and Mayor of Northlake
 Little Arthur Duncan, a Chicago blues and electric blues harmonica player, singer, and songwriter. Duncan died in Northlake of complications following brain surgery.
 Richard Fegley, professional photographer who worked for Playboy magazine for 30 years. He died in Northlake.
 Manny Flores, Alderman for Chicago's 1st ward from 2003 to 2010. He was raised in Northlake.
 Geoffrey Obrzut, Democratic member of the Illinois House of Representatives from 1991 to 1993. He was a Northlake resident while serving as State Representative.
 Mark Venturini, actor. He was a Northlake native and attended West Leyden High School.
 Linda Williamson, Republican member of the Illinois House of Representatives from 1985 to 1991. She was a Northlake resident while serving as State Representative.

References

External links

 City of Northlake official website
Northlake Public Library District

 
Chicago metropolitan area
Cities in Illinois
Cities in Cook County, Illinois